Belinda Teal Marchande Caldwell (born January 11, 1965) is a former American actress, best known for her role as Sheryl Rockmore on the Nickelodeon sitcom Kenan & Kel. She has also guest-starred on Martin and the UPN sitcom Good News. She has not acted professionally since Kenan & Kel ended in 2000.

Marchande once had a relationship with Washington Redskins linebacker Ravin Caldwell. Together they have a daughter Talia Caldwell, who played college basketball at the University of California, Berkeley. They reside in Los Angeles.

Filmography

References

External links

1965 births
20th-century American actresses
21st-century American actresses
Actresses from Michigan
African-American actresses
American film actresses
Living people
Actresses from Lansing, Michigan
20th-century African-American women
20th-century African-American people
21st-century African-American women
21st-century African-American people